is a Japanese footballer currently playing as a midfielder for Vegalta Sendai.

Career statistics

Club

Notes

References

External links

2002 births
Living people
Japanese footballers
Association football midfielders
J1 League players
Vegalta Sendai players